George Santos Silva or simply George (born January 7, 1986, in Ilheus), is a Brazilian left back. He currently plays for Corinthians.

Contract
8 December 2005 to 31 December 2008

External links
 CBF

1986 births
Living people
Brazilian footballers
Sport Club Corinthians Paulista players
Clube do Remo players
Association football defenders
People from Ilhéus
Sportspeople from Bahia